The ancient Egyptian noble Prehotep I (also known as Rahotep, Parahotep, Prehotep the Elder, Parehotp) was Vizier in the latter part of the reign of Ramesses II, during the 19th Dynasty.

Family
Parahotep is mentioned on two monuments belonging to the High Priest of Osiris Wennufer. On a statue now in the Athens Museum, the city governor and vizier Rahotep is said to be the (grand-)son of the High Priest of Osiris To and to be born of Maianuy. Wennufer also included his brother Prehotep in a family monument from Abydos. The vizier Nebamun is also said to be a brother of Wennufer and Prehotep. On another monument however Nebamun is said to be a son of Ramose and Sheritre, so he is more likely to be a cousin.

Monuments
Prehotep is known from a stela in Abydos (Cairo Jde 19775) which depicts Prehotep with two other men and three women adoring Osiris and Isis. A canopic jar with Selqet and Qebehsenuef protecting Prehotep is now in Brussels (E. 5901).

Prehotep is mentioned on Wennufer's monuments as mentioned in the section about family above.

Identity with vizier Prehotep II 
 for the possible identity with a namesake, compare: Prehotep II (Vizier)

References

Ancient Egyptian viziers
Viziers of the Nineteenth Dynasty of Egypt
13th-century BC people
Ramesses II